Dearborn County is one of 92 counties of the U.S. state of Indiana located on the Ohio border near the southeast corner of the state. It was formed in 1803 from a portion of Hamilton County, Ohio. In 2020, the population was 50,679. The county seat and largest city is Lawrenceburg.
Dearborn County is part of the Cincinnati, OH-KY-IN Metropolitan Statistical Area.

History

In 1803, following Ohio's admission to the Union, a wedge, or pie shaped, remnant of the former Northwest Territory along Ohio's southwestern border was ceded to Indiana Territory and organized as Dearborn County. It was named after Henry Dearborn who was U.S. Secretary of War at that time. Lawrenceburg was then designated as the county seat.

All or part of seven other present day counties were carved from the original county with the present boundaries being established in 1845. The region, nicknamed the "Gore", slices through the present-day counties of Dearborn, Franklin, Ohio, Randolph, Switzerland, Union, Wayne and Fayette. Subdivision of Dearborn County began in 1811 with the formation of Franklin and Wayne Counties, followed by Switzerland in 1814.

Early growth in the region was centered on Lawrenceburg which became an important railroad junction connecting two of the regions major rail lines. A contention existed between the towns of Lawrenceburg and the mostly German-speaking immigrants that dominated Rising Sun over the favored status of Lawrenceburg as the county seat. The rivalry between the two towns was resolved in 1844 when the Indiana State legislature separated the portion of Dearborn County south of Laughery Creek and created the last and smallest Indiana county, county of Ohio on March 1, 1844, with Rising Sun designated as its county seat.

Geography
Part of the southeastern county line is formed by the Ohio River.

Dearborn County contains the Perfect North Slopes ski resort.

Cities
 Aurora
 Lawrenceburg
 Greendale

Towns
 Dillsboro
 Moores Hill
 Saint Leon
 West Harrison

Census-designated places
 Bright
 Hidden Valley

Other unincorporated communities

 Bonnell
 Braysville
 Chesterville
 Cochran
 Cold Springs
 Dover
 Farmers Retreat
 Guilford
 Hardinsburg
 Hubbells Corner
 Kyle
 Lawrenceburg Junction
 Lawrenceville
 Logan
 Manchester
 Mount Sinai
 New Alsace
 Sparta
 Weisburg
 Wilmington
 Wrights Corner
 Yorkville

Townships

 Caesar Creek
 Center
 Clay
 Harrison
 Hogan
 Jackson
 Kelso
 Lawrenceburg
 Logan
 Manchester
 Miller
 Sparta
 Washington
 York

Adjacent counties
 Franklin County (north)
 Butler County, Ohio (northeast)
 Hamilton County, Ohio (east)
 Boone County, Kentucky (southeast)
 Ohio County (south)
 Ripley County (west)

Climate 

Demographics

At the 2010 United States Census, there were 50,047 people, 18,743 households and 13,773 families residing in the county. The racial makeup of the county was 97.5% white, 0.6% black or African American, 0.4% Asian, 0.2% American Indian, 0.1% Pacific islander, 0.3% from other races, and 1.0% from two or more races. Those of Hispanic or Latino origin made up 1.0% of the population. In terms of ancestry, 46.5% were German, 19.2% were Irish, 11.4% were English, and 7.8% were American.

Of the 18,743 households, 35.1% had children under the age of 18 living with them, 58.5% were married couples living together, 10.0% had a female householder with no husband present, 26.5% were non-families, and 22.0% of all households were made up of individuals. The average household size was 2.64 and the average family size was 3.07. The median age was 40.0 years.

The median household income was $47,697 and the median family income was $66,561. Males had a median income of $45,270 and females $33,353. The per capita income was $25,023. About 4.5% of families and 7.2% of the population were below the poverty line, including 8.5% of those under age 18 and 6.3% of those age 65 or over.

2020 census

Government

The county government is a constitutional body, and is granted specific powers by the Constitution of Indiana, and by the Indiana Code.

County Council: The county council is the legislative branch of the county government and controls all the spending and revenue collection in the county. Representatives are elected from county districts. The council members serve four-year terms. They are responsible for setting salaries, the annual budget, and special spending. The council also has limited authority to impose local taxes, in the form of an income and property tax that is subject to state level approval, excise taxes, and service taxes.

Board of Commissioners: The executive body of the county is made of a board of commissioners. The commissioners are elected county-wide, in staggered terms, and each serves a four-year term. One of the commissioners, typically the most senior, serves as president. The commissioners are charged with executing the acts legislated by the council, collecting revenue, and managing the day-to-day functions of the county government.

Court: Dearborn County's courts consist of a Circuit Court, presided over by the Honorable James Humphrey (shared with Ohio County in the only such arrangement in the state) and two Superior Courts, the Honorable Jonathan Cleary, presiding over Dearborn County Superior Court No. 1 and the Honorable Sally McLaughlin, presiding over Dearborn County z Superior Court No. 2. Judges are elected to six-year terms. Lawrenceburg also has City Courts, presided over by the Honorable Joseph R. Johns. The Lawrenceburg City Court Judge serves a four-year term.

County Officials: The county has several other elected offices, including sheriff, prosecuting attorney, coroner, auditor, treasurer, recorder, surveyor, and circuit court clerk. Each of these elected officers serves a term of four years and oversees a different part of county government. Members elected to county government positions are required to declare a party affiliation and to be residents of the county.

Dearborn County is part of Indiana's 6th congressional district; Indiana Senate district 43; and Indiana House of Representatives districts 55 and 68.

Infrastructure

Major highways
  Interstate 74
  Interstate 275
  U.S. Route 50
  U.S. Route 52
  State Road 1
  State Road 46
  State Road 48
  State Road 56
  State Road 62
  State Road 148
  State Road 262
  State Road 350

Notable people
 Nick Goepper professional slopestyle skier, three-time winter Olympic medalist
 Erwin "Cannonball" Baker, motorcycle and auto racer, 1989 inductee in Motorsports Hall of Fame of America
 John Whiteaker, first state Governor of Oregon from 1859 until 1862 and Oregon's Congressman from 1879 to 1881
 Jim Lyttle, professional baseball player
 Lonnie Mack, influential guitar soloist of early rock 'n' roll
 Louis Skidmore, architect that co-founded Skidmore, Owings & Merrill

See also
 National Register of Historic Places listings in Dearborn County, Indiana

References

External links
 Official website

 
Indiana counties
1803 establishments in Indiana Territory
Populated places established in 1803
Indiana counties on the Ohio River